Acrophylla titan, the titan stick insect, is the second-longest stick insect found in Australia.

It is native to south-east Queensland and New South Wales.

Description

The females can be easily identified as being larger than the males. Males are able to fly but females are not.

Breeding 
Titans breed during winter/summer. During the mating process, the male connects his abdomen to the lower part of the female's egg compartment. Mating can take up to 40mins and is repeated several times. The female will end up with a fat abdomen and will produce many eggs (200 to 1000) in her lifetime.

The females then flick their eggs to the ground. The eggs look like those of the children's stick insect (Tropidoderus childrenii) but they are black-grey with a small white growth. Ants pick them up and eat the growth, and leave the egg in the refinery where they hatch.

See also
List of Australian stick insects and mantids
Spur legged phasmid
Children's stick insect
Goliath stick insect

External links
Phasmid Study Group: Acrophylla titan
Brisbane Insects: Titan Stick Insect
Queensland Museum Factsheet
Bugs Ed: Titan Stick Insect

Phasmatodea
Insects of Australia
Endemic fauna of Australia
Insects described in 1827